A measuring spoon is a spoon  used to measure an amount of an ingredient, either liquid or dry, when cooking.  Measuring spoons may be made of plastic, metal, and other materials.  They are available in many sizes, including the teaspoon and tablespoon.

Country differences

International 
Metric measuring spoons are available in sets, usually between four and six, typically with decilitre (100 ml), tablespoon (15 ml), teaspoon (5 ml) and millilitre measures. For fractional measures, there is often a line inside to indicate "half" or "a quarter", or a separate measure may be included, like  dl.

United States 
In the U.S., measuring spoons often come in sets, usually between four and six. This usually includes ¼, ½, and 1 teaspoon and 1 tablespoon. 
The volume of a traditional US teaspoon is 4.9 ml and that of a tablespoon is 14.8 ml, only slightly less than standard metric measuring spoons.

Japan 
A large spoon is 15 milliliters, and a small spoon is 5 milliliters.
Sometimes a much smaller spoon may be used, usually a 2.5 milliliter spoon (½ small spoon).

Australia 
The Australian definition of the tablespoon as a unit of volume is larger than most:

{|
|-
|1 Australian tablespoon ||colspan=3| = 20 ml
|-
|-
| || = 2 dessertspoons, ||style="text-align:right;"|     1 dessertspoon = || 10 ml each 
|-
| || = 4 teaspoons,  ||style="text-align:right;"| 1 teaspoon = ||   5 ml each 
|}

Specialized measuring spoons 

Special spoons are manufactured to measure popular materials for common tasks. For example, for coffee the standard measuring spoon contains 7 grams of coffee powder, adequate for a 150 ml espresso.

Measuring with cutlery spoons 
Cutlery in many countries includes two spoons (besides the fork and knife, or butterknife). These cutlery spoons are also called a "teaspoon" and "tablespoon", but are not necessarily the same volume as measuring spoons with the same names: Cutlery spoons are not made to standard sizes and may hold 2.5~7.3 ml (50%~146% of 5 ml) for teaspoons and 7~20 ml (47%~133% of 15 ml) for tablespoons. The difference in size can be dangerous when cutlery is used for critical measurements, like medication.

See also 
Measuring cup
Cooking weights and measures
Kitchen utensil

References

Spoons
Food preparation utensils
Cooking weights and measures
Volumetric instruments
Units of volume